Peter James Cregan (April 13, 1875 – May 18, 1945) was an outfielder in Major League Baseball.

External links

1875 births
1945 deaths
Major League Baseball outfielders
New York Giants (NL) players
19th-century baseball players
Baseball players from New York (state)
Sportspeople from Kingston, New York
Kingston Patriarchs players
Schenectady Dorpians players
Burials at Calvary Cemetery (Queens)